Trey Lorenz is the debut solo album by R&B singer-songwriter Trey Lorenz. It was released on Epic Records in 1992, and features 11 tracks, 8 of which Lorenz co-wrote.

The album featured 3 singles: "Someone to Hold", which peaked at 19 on the pop charts and reached number 5 on the R&B chart. The next single, "Photograph of Mary", peaked at number 46 on the R&B charts while reaching number 11 on the dance charts. The third and final single, the Lionel Richie-penned "Just to Be Close to You" got as far as number 66 on the R&B charts.

Track listing
"Someone to Hold" (Lorenz, Carey, Afanasieff) – 4:43
"Photograph of Mary" (Swirsky) – 4:26
"Just to Be Close to You"  (Richie) – 4:47
"Run Back to Me" (Lorenz, Scott Cutler, Brian O'Doherty) – 4:22
"Always in Love" (Lorenz, Carey, Afanasieff) – 5:16
"Wipe All My Tears Away" (Lorenz, Morales, M. Rooney) – 4:47
"Baby I'm in Heaven" (Lorenz, Thomas) – 4:52
"It Only Hurts When It's Love" (Lorenz, Ballard) – 4:15
"How Can I Say Goodbye" (Lorenz, Cutler, O'Doherty) – 4:14
"Find a Way" (Lorenz, Ballard) – 3:51
"When Troubles Come" (Winans) – 5:14

Commercial performance

The album peaked at No. 111 on the Billboard 200 chart and Lorenz was dropped from the label due to the poor showing.

Production
Executive producers: Lee Dannay, Tommy Mottola
Producers: Walter Afanasieff, Glen Ballard, Mariah Carey, Mark Morales, Mark C. Rooney, Keith Thomas & BeBe Winans 
Co-producers: Ren Klyce, Randy Jackson, Dan Shea, Jeff Bova, Louis Upkins, Jr.
Engineers: Dana Jon Chappelle, Francis Buckley, Keith Compton, Mike Fronda, David Gleeson (also second engineer), Lolly Grodner, Manny Lacarrubba (also second engineer), Mike McCarthy, Katherine Miller, Mike Poole, Michael White, Bill Whittington
Assistant and second engineers: Lee Anthony, Brian Carrigan, Amy Hughes, John Kunz, Thom Kadley, Rich Lamb, Todd Moore
Mixing: Francis Buckley, Dana Jon Chappelle, Mike McCarthy, Bill Whittington
Mix assistants: Lee Anthony, Brian Carrigan, Amy Hughes, John Kunz
Mastering: Bob Ludwig

Personnel
Drums, percussion: Steve Brewster
Drum programming: Ren Klyce, Mark Morales, Keith Thomas
Bass: Walter Afanasieff, Victor Caldwell, Randy Jackson, Dan Shea, Keith Thomas
Synthesized bass: Randy Jackson, Dan Shea
Guitars: Walter Afanasieff, Tom Hemby, Jerry McPherson, Michael Landau
Keyboards, synthesizers, organ, piano: Walter Afanasieff, Glen Ballard, Cedric Caldwell, Marc Harris, Randy Jackson, Randy Kerber, Ren Klyce, Mark C. Rooney, Dan Shea, Keith Thomas, Bobby Wooten
Akai programming, Synclavier programming, MacIntosh programming: Ren Klyce, Gary Cirimelli
Saxophone: Mark Douthit, Dan Higgins, Kelly O'Neal
Trombone: Barry Green
Trumpet: Jerry Hey; Arranged By Jerry Hey & Mike Morris
Handclapping: Will Downing, Trey Lorenz, Cindy Mizelle, The Soul Sisters, Audrey Wheeler
Strings conducted by Carl Gorodetzky; arranged by Ronn Huff
Vocal arrangements: Mariah Carey, Scott Cutler, Trey Lorenz, Cindy Mizelle, Brian O'Doherty, Keith Thomas, Audrey Wheeler

References

1992 debut albums
Albums produced by Glen Ballard
Epic Records albums
Trey Lorenz albums
Albums produced by Walter Afanasieff